Anthony "Nino" Giarratano (born June 2, 1962) was an American college baseball coach, who served as head coach of the San Francisco Dons baseball team from 1999 to 2022.

In March of 2022, Giarratano was fired from USF due to a class-action lawsuit that three former players targeted towards him which stated that Giarratano had inappropriate sexual conduct allegations.

Early life and education
Born in Pueblo, Colorado, Giarratano attended Pueblo South High School and graduated in 1980. He then attended William Jewell College in Liberty, Missouri, earning a degree in physical education in 1985.  He later added a master's degree from Adams State College in Alamosa, Colorado.

Coaching career
In 1989, he began his coaching career at Trinidad State, a junior college in Trinidad, Colorado.  In six seasons with the Trojans, Giarratano led teams to five NJCAA World Series. In 1994, Giarratano managed the Bourne Braves, a collegiate summer baseball team in the prestigious Cape Cod Baseball League. His Bourne team featured future major leaguers Jeremy Giambi and Mark Kotsay. He then spent two seasons at Yavapai College in Prescott, Arizona.  He sent 25 of his players to professional contracts before becoming an assistant at Arizona State in 1997.  Giarratano served as hitting instructor, offensive coordinator, and third base coach and helped lead the team to the 1998 College World Series final.

Giarratano moved to San Francisco to become head coach in 1999.  In his time with the Dons, he has led teams to three NCAA Regionals, their only appearances in the Tournament in program history.  The Dons have also claimed a pair of West Coast Conference Championships, and earned Giarratano WCC Coach of the Year honors three times.  Giarratano is the program's all-time leader in wins.

Sexual conduct scandal
On March 11, 2022, ESPN released an article titled Ex-San Francisco Dons baseball players sue Nino Giarratano, Troy Nakamura and others over alleged behavior alleging that head coach Giarratano and former assistant, Troy Nakamura oversaw an environment that "included persistent psychological abuse and repeated inappropriate sexual conduct." 

Three former USF players, filed a class-action lawsuit against Giarratano and Troy Nakamura. Going by the alias "John Doe", the former players described varying forms of abuse and described a culture in which "it was 'normal' to see [Nakamura] naked on the field or in a window, swinging his penis in a helicopter fashion while the entire team -- and [Giarratano] -- watched." "John Doe 1" alleged that Giarratano referred to him using several expletives and repeatedly berated him in an attempt to pressure him to leave the program (he had a significant four-year guaranteed scholarship). He entered the transfer portal in January. "John Doe 2" outlined a pattern of verbal and emotional abuse that resulted in five emergency room visits in the fall of 2021, which contributed to his decision to leave the program. "John Doe 3" said Giarratano told him he was a waste of space, that none of his teammates or coaches liked him, and said, "I wish I could take my bat and hit your head as hard as I can, and maybe I can get your brain to work," according to the lawsuit. Another former USF baseball player, Tyler Imbach described having suicidal thoughts in a public Instagram post in September of 2021, and told the San Francisco Chronicle this week: "The USF thing definitely compounded my mental health issues. USF was a rough experience, just the way I was treated by the coaching staff. It kind of sent me over the edge."

On March 13, 2022, Giarratano was fired immediately from USF. University of San Francisco Athletic Director, Joan McDermott stated, "When the university first became aware of the complaints by students and families about the environment and behavior of coaches in the baseball program, we immediately conducted an internal investigation that led to the firing of Troy Nakamura and an official reprimand of Nino Giarratano."

Head coaching record

References

1962 births
Living people
Arizona State Sun Devils baseball coaches
Cape Cod Baseball League coaches
San Francisco Dons baseball coaches
Trinidad State Trojans baseball coaches
William Jewell College alumni
Yavapai Roughriders baseball coaches
Adams State University alumni
Sportspeople from Pueblo, Colorado